is a city located in Miyagi Prefecture, Japan. , the city had an estimated population of 43,946 in 18,062 households, and a population density of 730 persons per km². Iwanuma is at the convergence of two ancient roads, the Tōkaidō and the Rikuzen-Hama Kaidō.

Geography
Iwanuma is in the east-center Miyagi Prefecture, bordered by the Pacific Ocean to the east. It is also located at the mouth of the Abukuma River.

Neighboring municipalities
Miyagi Prefecture
Natori
Shibata
Murata
Watari

Climate
Iwanuma has a humid climate (Köppen climate classification Cfa) characterized by mild summers and cold winters.  The average annual temperature in Iwanuma is 12.6 °C. The average annual rainfall is 1252 mm with September as the wettest month. The temperatures are highest on average in August, at around 24.9 °C, and lowest in January, at around 1.6 °C.

Demographics
Per Japanese census data, the population of Iwanuma has recently plateued after a long period of growth.

History
The area of present-day Iwanuma was part of ancient Mutsu Province, and the Takekoma Inari Shrine claims to have been founded in 842 AD. Mention of “Iwanuma Castle” appears in early Muromachi period documents. The area came under the control of the Date clan of Sendai Domain during the Edo period, under the Tokugawa shogunate. The town of Iwanuma was established on June 1, 1889 with the establishment of the modern municipalities system.

The village of Okuma merged with Iwanuma on January 11, 1947, followed by Sengan and Tamaura on April 1, 1955. Iwanuma was raised to city status on November 1, 1971.

The city was seriously affected by the tsunami associated with the 2011 Tōhoku earthquake, which resulted in 180 deaths.

Government
Iwanuma has a mayor-council form of government with a directly elected mayor and a unicameral city legislature of 20 members. Iwanuma contributes one seat to the Miyagi Prefectural legislature. In terms of national politics, the city is part of Miyagi 3rd district of the lower house of the Diet of Japan.

Education
Iwanuma has four public elementary school and four public middle schools operated by the city government, and one public high school operated by the Miyagi Prefectural Board of Education. The prefectural also operates a special education school for the handicapped.

Transportation

Railway
 East Japan Railway Company (JR East) -   Tōhoku Main Line/Jōban Line

Highway
  – Iwanuma IC

Media
Iwanuma Community FM Station

Local attractions
 Takekoma Inari Shrine, - claiming to be the second oldest Inari shrine

Sister city relations
  – Napa, California, USA, since February 15, 1973 .
  – Dover, Delaware, USA friendship city since 2003
  – Nankoku, Kōchi, Japan since July 23, 1973
  – Obanazawa, Yamagata, Japan since November 7, 1999

Noted people from Iwanuma 
Ryusuke Taguchi, professional wrestler
Kiyoko Ono, former politician and artistic gymnast

References

External links

Official Website 

Cities in Miyagi Prefecture
Populated coastal places in Japan
Iwanuma, Miyagi